HMS Bellerophon was a central battery ironclad built for the Royal Navy in the mid-1860s.

Design and description 

In this ship, designed by Sir Edward Reed, the power-to-weight ratio was increased; the long rows of guns on the broadside were replaced by a small number of guns, centrally placed, of the largest possible calibre; the armour was increased in thickness but reduced in length, and a sharp beak ram was combined with a classical style plough bow.

This double bottom had the added advantage of allowing the engine to be carried higher, raising the centre of gravity of the whole ship and making her thereby a steadier gun platform. Unlike earlier classes, Bellerophon'''s bow and stern had a "U" shaped profile, giving increased buoyancy at the ends noticeably absent in some earlier battleships.Bellerophon carried the first balanced rudder in Royal Navy service. Full helm could be applied by eight men in about 27 seconds, whereas in HMS Warrior it took forty men 90 seconds to perform the same manoeuvre.

Propulsion
 Bellerophon had one 2-cylinder trunk steam engine made by John Penn and Sons driving a single  propeller. The engine produced a total of  during the ship's sea trials in August 1864 and the ship had a maximum speed .

Bellerophon was "dull under canvas" and only made  under sail in a moderate gale. The ship's propeller could be disconnected to reduce drag while under sail.

ArmamentBellerophon was the first British ironclad to carry the 9-inch rifled muzzle-loading gun. All ten of the  guns were mounted on the main deck, five on each side. Five 7-inch rifled muzzle-loaders were mounted outside the battery as chase guns. Four of these were mounted in pairs fore and aft on the main deck; the last gun was mounted on the upper deck at the stern. The ship also had four breech-loading 12-pounder Armstrong guns for use as saluting guns.

It was credited with the nominal ability to penetrate  armour.

When the ship was refitted in 1881–85, she became the only British ironclad to have her entire muzzle-loading armament replaced by breech-loaders. Bellerophon received ten BL Mk III guns, mounted in the central battery and four 6-inch (152 mm) guns as chase guns fore and aft. The forward guns were mounted in new embrasures in the forecastle on the upper deck as the original guns were too low and were usually washed out in a head sea. Eight 4-inch breech-loading guns as well as four quick-firing 6-pounder Hotchkiss and 12 machine guns were fitted for defence against torpedo boats. The ship also received two  Whitehead torpedo launchers that were carried on the main deck, outside the armoured battery. The new eight-inch guns were some  longer than the original nine-inch guns and the central battery proved to be too small for effective use of the guns.

The forward chase guns were protected by a strake of  armour.

Construction
The usage of longitudinal girders to impart strength and resistance to the hull was discarded, and a "bracket frame" system devised by Nathaniel Barnaby was adopted. Some steel was used in the hull to save weight.

HMS Bellerophon was ordered on 23 July 1863 from the Royal Dockyard in Chatham, Kent. She was laid down on 28 December 1863 and launched on 26 April 1865. The ship was commissioned in March 1866 and completed on 11 April 1866. Bellerophon cost £356,493.

Service historyBellerophon was commissioned at Chatham, and served in the Channel Fleet until 1871. The ship served with the Mediterranean Fleet from 1871 to 1872, and then paid off for refit where she was given a poop deck. Bellerophon relieved  as flagship on the North America station in 1873. On 24 November 1873, Bellerophon collided with the Liverpool, Brazil and River Plate Steam Navigation Company's steamship , which sank. All on board Flamsteed were rescued by the Portuguese ship Blimani. Bellerophon remained on the North America station until 1881. An extensive refit, including new boilers and new armament was followed by a further period on the North America station until 1892, when she paid off at Plymouth. She was re-commissioned as port guardship at Pembroke until 1903. Bellerophon was converted into a stokers' training ship in 1904, and renamed HMS Indus III. The ship was sold on 12 December 1922 to P. and W. McLellan for scrap, although she did not arrive in Bo'ness for breaking-up until March 1923.

Notes

Footnotes

References
 
 
 
 
 Reed, E. J.: Our Iron-clad Ships'', London 1869. Available at archive.org

External links

 Picture gallery

 

Battleships of the Royal Navy
1865 ships
Victorian-era battleships of the United Kingdom
Ships built in Chatham
Maritime incidents in November 1873